Belleair Bluffs is a city in Pinellas County, Florida, United States.  The population was 2,031 at the 2010 census.

Geography

Demographics

At the 2000 census there were 2,243 people in 1,327 households, including 609 families, in the city. The population density was 4,857.7 inhabitants per square mile (1,882.7/km). The racial makeup of the city was 97.95% White, 0.18% African American, 0.98% Asian, 0.18% from other races, and 0.71% from two or more races. Hispanic or Latino of any race were 1.25%.

Of the 1,327 households 9.9% had children under the age of 18 living with them, 37.9% were married couples living together, 6.0% had a female householder with no husband present, and 54.1% were non-families. 48.5% of households were one person and 29.3% were one person aged 65 or older. The average household size was 1.69 and the average family size was 2.34.

The age distribution was 8.8% under the age of 18, 3.5% from 18 to 24, 18.2% from 25 to 44, 25.4% from 45 to 64, and 44.1% 65 or older. The median age was 60 years. For every 100 females, there were 76.2 males. For every 100 females age 18 and over, there were 74.4 males.

The median household income was $32,528 and the median family income  was $48,421. Males had a median income of $40,987 versus $25,658 for females. The per capita income for the city was $31,329. About 1.2% of families and 6.1% of the population were below the poverty line, including none of those under age 18 and 7.7% of those age 65 or over.

References

External links
 City of Belleair Bluffs official website

Cities in Pinellas County, Florida
Populated places on the Intracoastal Waterway in Florida
Cities in Florida
1963 establishments in Florida
Populated places established in 1963